Victorian Carnivorous Plant Society Inc., formerly titled simply Victorian Carnivorous Plant Society and also known as the VCPS Journal, is a quarterly periodical and the official publication of the Victorian Carnivorous Plant Society of Australia. Typical articles include matters of horticultural interest, field reports, literature reviews, and plant descriptions. The journal was established in early 1984, a year after the society itself was founded. Early in its history, issues were grouped into volumes; this system was later abandoned in favour of continuous issue numbering. The journal totals around 80 pages annually.

References

External links 
 
 Complete journal index from 1984 to June 2003

Magazines established in 1984
Quarterly magazines published in Australia
Carnivorous plant magazines
Science and technology magazines